Wañuma (Aymara waña dry, uma water, "dry water", erroneously also spelled KHuañuma) is a  mountain in the Andes of Bolivia. It is located in the Potosí Department, Cornelio Saavedra Province, Tacobamba Municipality. Wañuma lies on the right bank of the Ch'aki Mayu (Quechua for "dry river"). Its waters flow to the Pillku Mayu (Quechua for "red river"):

References 

Mountains of Potosí Department